The 1924 Calgary municipal election was held on December 10, 1924 to elect six aldermen to sit on Calgary City Council.

Calgary City Council had twelve at-large aldermen on city council, but six of the positions were already filled: Andrew Davison, Thomas Alexander Hornibrook, Walter Little, William Henry Ross, Samuel Stanley Savage, and Robert Cadogan Thomas, were all elected to two-year terms in 1923 and were still in office. Mayor George Harry Webster had previously been elected to a two-year term in the 1923 election.

Plebiscites held required a two-thirds majority to pass.

The election was held under the Single Transferable Voting/Proportional Representation (STV/PR) with the term for Alderman being two years.

Results

Council
Peter Turner Bone
Thomas Henry Crawford
Eneas Edward McCormick
John Walker Russell
Ruben Weldon Ward
Frederick James White

See also
List of Calgary municipal elections

References

Sources
Frederick Hunter: THE MAYORS AND COUNCILS  OF  THE CORPORATION OF CALGARY Archived March 3, 2020

1920s in Calgary
Municipal elections in Calgary
1924 elections in Canada